The Chinese Society of Astronautics (abbreviated CSA) is a professional association of individuals with an interest in space. As of 2019, the society has 38 specialized committees and 179 working committees with more than 30,000 individual members.

History
The initial concept of the Chinese Society of Astronautics was proposed in 1977 and accepted by the China Association for Science and Technology (CAST). The Chinese Society of Astronautics was founded by Qian Xuesen, Ren Xinmin and Zhang Zhenhuan on October 23, 1979. In September 1980 it became a member of the International Astronautical Federation (IAF).

Scientific publishing
 Journal of Astronautics
Advances in Aerospace Science and Technology
Space Exploration

List of presidents

References

External links
 

Space advocacy organizations
Scientific organizations established in 1979
Organizations based in Beijing
1979 establishments in China